Theodor Pištěk (13 June 1895 – 5 August 1960) was a Czech actor and film director. He appeared in more than 230 films between 1921 and 1959. He is the father of the painter and costume designer Theodor Pištěk.

Selected filmography

 The Cross by the Brook (1921)
 Two Mothers (1921)
 Jánošík (1921)
 Gypsies (1922)
 Modern Marriages (1924)
 The Lantern (1925)
 The Countess from Podskalí (1926)
 Never the Twain (1926)
 Suzy Saxophone (1928)
 Eve's Daughters (1928)
 Affair at the Grand Hotel (1929)
 Father Radetzky (1929)
 Such Is Life (1929)
 Street Acquaintances (1929)
 Ship of Girls (1929)
 Erotikon (1929)
 Imperial and Royal Field Marshal (1930)
 Him and His Sister (1931)
 Muži v offsidu (1931)
 Sister Angelika (1932)
 Anton Spelec, Sharp-Shooter (1932)
 The Undertaker (1932)
 The Ideal Schoolmaster (1932)
 Life Is a Dog (1933)
 In the Little House Below Emauzy (1933)
 Public Not Admitted (1933)
 The Inspector General (1933)
 Hrdinný kapitán Korkorán (1934)
 Jedenácté přikázání (1935)
 Jánošík (1935)
 Grand Hotel Nevada (1935)
 Three Men in the Snow (1936)
 Paradise Road (1936)
 Irca's Romance (1936)
 The Seamstress (1936)
 Father Vojtech (1936)
 A Step into the Darkness (1937)
 Cause for Divorce (1937)
 Lawyer Vera (1937)
 Tři vejce do skla (1937)
 The Lantern (1938)
 Duchacek Will Fix It (1938)
 Škola základ života (1938)
 A Foolish Girl (1938)
 The Merry Wives (1938)
 The Catacombs (1940)
 Baron Prášil (1940)
 For a Friend (1940)
 May Fairy Tale (1940)
 Arthur and Leontine (1940)
 Auntie's Fantasies (1941)
 Jan Cimbura (1941)
 A Charming Man (1941)
 Valentin the Good (1942)
 Gabriela (1942)
 I'll Be Right Over (1942)
 Průlom (1946)
 Čapek's Tales (1947)
 The Poacher's Foster Daughter or Noble Millionaire (1949)
 Anna Proletářka (1950)
 May Events (1951)
 Komedianti (1954)
 Leave It to Me (1955)
 The Princess with the Golden Star (1959)

References

External links
 

1895 births
1960 deaths
Male actors from Prague
People from the Kingdom of Bohemia
Czech male film actors
Czech male silent film actors
20th-century Czech male actors
Czech film directors